Gonzalo José Latorre Bovio (born 26 April 1996) is an Uruguayan footballer who plays as a forward.

References

External links

1996 births
Living people
Association football forwards
Uruguayan footballers
Uruguayan expatriate footballers
Uruguay youth international footballers
Uruguayan Primera División players
Serie C players
Peñarol players
Atenas de San Carlos players
Cruzeiro Esporte Clube players
A.S. Sambenedettese players
Uruguayan expatriate sportspeople in Brazil
Expatriate footballers in Brazil
Uruguayan expatriate sportspeople in Italy
Expatriate footballers in Italy